The 1993 North Dakota State Bison football team was an American football team that represented North Dakota State University during the 1993 NCAA Division II football season as a member of the North Central Conference. In their seventh year under head coach Rocky Hager, the team compiled a 7–3 record.

Schedule

References

North Dakota State
North Dakota State Bison football seasons
North Dakota State Bison football